William Fisher Lewis (15 May 1902 - 6 September 1964) was an Episcopal prelate who served as Bishop of Nevada from 1942 to 1959 and Bishop of Olympia from 1960 to 1964.

Education
Lewis was born on May 15, 1902, in Elmsford, New York, the son of the Reverend Charles Smith Lewis and Ethel Lynde Digbee Oliver. He was educated at St Luke's school in Wayne, Pennsylvania. He graduated from Harvard University in 1923 with a Bachelor of Arts. Later he attended the General Theological Seminary from where he graduated in 1926.

Ordination
Lewis was ordain deacon in April 1926 and served as deacon of Pennington and Broad Street Missions in Trenton, New Jersey. He was ordained priest in October 1926. He was appointed priest-in-charge of Madison Valley Missions in Montana. In 1931 he became rector of St James' Church in Bozeman, Montana and in 1936 rector of St Paul's Church in Burlington, Vermont.

Bishop
On February 18, 1942, Lewis was elected Bishop of Nevada by the House of Bishops. He was consecrated bishop on May 12, 1942, by Presiding Bishop Henry St. George Tucker in Grace Cathedral, San Francisco. He remained in Nevada till 1959 when he was elected as Coadjutor Bishop of Olympia on 12 June of that year. He assumed his new position on October 1, 1959, and succeeded as diocesan on January 1, 1960. He died in 1964.

References 

1902 births
1964 deaths
General Theological Seminary alumni
Harvard University alumni
20th-century American Episcopalians
Episcopal bishops of Olympia
Episcopal bishops of Nevada
20th-century American clergy